Rolf is a male given name and a surname. It originates in the Germanic name Hrolf, itself a contraction of Hrodwulf (Rudolf), a conjunction of the stem words hrod ("renown") + wulf ("wolf").  The Old Norse cognate is Hrólfr. An alternative but less common variation of Rolf in Norway is Rolv.

The oldest evidence of the use of the name Rolf in Sweden is an inscription from the 11th century on a runestone in Forsheda, Småland. The name also appears twice in the Orkneyinga sagas, where a scion of the jarls of Orkney, Gånge-Rolf, is said to be identical to the Viking Rollo who captured Normandy in 911. This Saga of the Norse begins with the abduction of Gói daughter by a certain Hrolf of Berg, (the Mountain). She is the daughter of Thorri, a Jotun of Gandvik, and sister of Gór and Nór. The latter is regarded as a first king and eponymous anchestor of Nórway. After a fierce duell (Holmgang) where none is able to overcome the other, Hrolf and Nór become friends; Góí apparently was abducted willingly and marries Hrolf. Nór marries Hedda, Hrolf's sister. Goi may be identical, or reflect the story of the Jotunn and Åsynja Gefhjón who fools the Swedish King Gylfi of Uppsala, plowing the lands where the great lakes in Sweden are, making the island of Zealand (and some more of the Danish islands, but not Fyn) and establishes the high seat of the Scyldings at Lejre (Hliðarbru) the proposed main artificial island. Hroðulf of the Beowolf epic may be conferred as well as the Saga of Hrolf Kraki.  
Rolf is a first name or part of a double name or a longer name in Sweden, Norway, Germany, Finland and Denmark, and to a lesser extent in Iceland.

In Europe the name Rolf is most popular in Sweden where, as of 2012, there were 54,737 people with Rolf as their first name or part of a double or a longer name. At the same time there were 511 people in Sweden with Rolf as their last name. As a given name, Rolf reached its peak in popularity in the decade of the 1960s.

The name day for Rolf in both Norway and Sweden is August 27.
The Day for Rolf on the Finnish-Swedish calendar is March 6.

Notable Rolfs or Hrolfs include:

Given names
 Hrólf Kraki, legendary king of Denmark
 Göngu-Hrólfr, Norwegian jarl that Orkneyinga Saga identifies with Rollo, the Viking conqueror of Normandy
 Rolf Beeler, Swiss cheese entrepreneur
 Rolf-Göran Bengtsson (born 1962), Swedish equestrian jumper
 Rolf Benirschke (born 1955), American footballer and game show host
 Rolf Billberg (1930–1966), Swedish musician
 Rolf de Heer (born 1951), Dutch-Australian film director
 Rolf Ekéus, (born 1935), Swedish diplomat
 Rolf Ericson (1922–1997), Swedish musician
 Rolf Falk-Larssen (born 1960), Norwegian speed skater
 Rolf G. Fjelde (1926–2002), American playwright, educator and poet
 Rolf Forsberg (1925–2017), Swedish-American playwright, film and theater director
 Rolf Gindorf (1939–2016), German sexologist
 Rolf Gölz (born 1962), German road and track cyclist
 Rolf Groven (born 1943), Norwegian painter
 Rolf Harris (born 1930), former Australian entertainer
 Rolf Hauge (officer) (1915–1989), Norwegian army officer
 Rolf Hochhuth (1931–2020), German author and playwright
 Rolf Jacobsen (poet) (1907–1994), Norwegian author
Rolf Kanies (born 1957), German actor
 Rolf Løvland (born 1955), Norwegian composer
 Rolf Mützelburg (1913–1942), German U-Boat commander during World War II
 Rolf Nevanlinna (1895–1980), Finnish mathematician
 Rolf Rheborg (1922–1983), Swedish Navy rear admiral
 Rolf Roosalu (Rolf Junior), Estonian singer
 Rolf Rämgård (born 1934), Swedish politician and Olympic medalist in cross country skiing
 Rolf Jacob Sartorius (born 2002), American singer and internet meme
 Rolf Steiner (born 1933), Retired German mercenary
 Rolf Schläfli (born 1971), Swiss decathlete
 Rolf Singer (1906–1994), German mycologist
 Rolf Skoglund (1940–2022), Swedish actor
 Rolf Sørensen (born 1965), Danish professional road bicycle racer
 Rolf Daniel Vikstøl (born 1989), Norwegian footballer
 Rolf Wenkhaus (1917–1942), German actor 
 Rolf Widerøe (1902–1996), Norwegian particle physicist
 Rolf Wirtén (1931–2023), Swedish politician
 Rolv Wesenlund (1936–2013), Norwegian actor
 Rolf M. Zinkernagel (born 1944), Swiss Professor of Experimental Immunology, 1996 Nobel Prize in Physiology or Medicine
 Rolf Zuckowski (born 1947), German singer-songwriter

Surname
 Ernst Rolf (1891–1932),  Swedish actor and singer. 
 Tom Rolf (1931–2014), Swedish-born American film editor, son of Ernst Rolf.
 Ida P. Rolf (1896–1979), American biochemist and founder of Rolfing, a holistic health discipline

Fictional characters
 Rolf, a cranky cartoon tiger in the Animal Crossing game series
 Rolf, a Peach Creek Cul-de-Sac kid from the Cartoon Network animated series Ed, Edd n Eddy
 Rolf, tragic hero of Phantasy Star II
 Rolf, a character in the Fire Emblem series
 Rolf Gruber, the delivery boy (and Nazi volunteer) in the play The Sound of Music
 Rowlf, an easy-going Muppet dog who plays the piano
 Rolf, a German Shepherd dog from Polish film Border Street
 Rolf, a character and protagonist in Isabel Allende's third novel Eva Luna

See also 
 Rolph, a surname
 Rolfe (disambiguation)
 ROFL, acronym for "Rolling On the Floor Laughing"

References

External links

 ROLF, a list of acronyms

Danish masculine given names
German masculine given names
Swedish masculine given names
Norwegian masculine given names
Scandinavian masculine given names
Surnames from given names